Kurt Kreuzinger (1905–1989) was a German botanist, best known for his work with cacti.

References 

20th-century German botanists
1905 births
1989 deaths